Saint-Georges is a city in the province of Quebec. It is the seat of Beauce-Sartigan Regional County Municipality, part of the Chaudière-Appalaches region. The population was 32,935 as of the Canada 2021 Census. Route 173 runs through Saint-Georges Est (where it is known as Boulevard Lacroix) and heads south to the border with Maine, USA.

The name of the parish and of the city, Saint-Georges, is in homage to George Pozer, the fourth seigneur of Aubert-Gallion.

The Beauce-Etchemin School Board (Commission scolaire de la Beauce-Etchemin) has its headquarters on 118th Street. Saint-Georges is home to the Cégep Beauce-Appalaches.

In 2002, it amalgamated with Saint-Georges-Est (pop. 4,110), Aubert-Gallion (pop. 2,444) and Saint-Jean-de-la-Lande (pop. 786).

It is home to one of the few inflatable dams, introduced to raise the water level of the Chaudière River for water-based activities and to make the riverside more attractive. Pedestrian bridges were also built over the river as part of the same project.

History
The history of Saint-Georges goes back to the late seventeenth century, at which point the region was inhabited principally by "Algonquin Indians". The first European presence recorded is that of a Jesuit missionary called Father Gabriel Druillettes who made three visits in 1646, 1650 and, finally, in 1651, but there was no colonial settlement established at this time. By the middle of the next century, however, two colonial "seigneuries" had been established on the present site of Saint-Georges: these were Aubin-de-l'Isle and Aubert-Gallion. Records indicate that in 1760 one of these, Aubert-Gallion, passed into the hands of Marie-Anne Josephte de l'Estrigant de St-Martin and of her daughter Charlotte-Marie-Anne-Joseph Aubert de la Chesnaye. The two heiresses sold their inheritance in 1768 to William Grant, a Scotsmen with ambitions to become a major Canadian landowner. Grant died in 1805 or 1807 (sources differ) and the estate was sold again, this time to the German (at least by birthplace), Johann Georg Pfotzer. The canonical parish of Saint-Georges was created in 1835, and the secular parish/municipality in 1856.

Economy
Although a relatively small city, Saint-Georges is often considered the Metropolis of Beauce Region because it's the largest city in the region. Saint-Georges is an important manufacturing centre, including textiles, steel forgings, garage doors, bicycles and truck trailers. The town is home to the headquarters of the Canam Group, a construction company, and Manac (trailers), the biggest semi-trailer manufacturer in Canada. Both these companies are under operation of the Dutil family. The city has a wide array of local and national retailers and restaurants, as well as many services including financial institutions, schools of different levels, medical clinics, a hospital and several others that are not found elsewhere in the region. Carrefour Saint-Georges is the largest shopping mall in town and in the region.

Saint-Georges is the headquarters of the intercity bus company Autocars La Chaudière, which provides bus services in the Beauce Region to Quebec City. The city also has a regional airport.

Demographics 

Population trend:
 Population in 2021: 32,935 (2016 to 2021 population change: 1.3%)
 Population in 2016: 32,513 
 Population in 2011: 31,173 
 Population in 2006: 29,616
 Population in 2001: 28,127
 Population in 1996: 20,057
 Population in 1991: 19,583

Mother Tongue:
 English: 0.9%
 French: 96.7%
 English and French: 0.4%
 Other only: 1.7%

In the 2021 Canadian Census, Saint-Georges was 96% white, 1.4% Aboriginal, and 2.6% visible minority.

City council
City council (as of 2022):
 Mayor: Claude Morin
 Councillors: Serge Thomassin, Tom Redmond, Jean Perron, Esther Fortin, Manon Bougie, Jean-Pierre Fortier, Olivier Duval, Renaud Fortier

Twin towns
Lisieux, France since 1996

Notable people
Maxime Bernier
Amélie Veille

See also
Beauce, Quebec

References

External links
Official site 

 
Cities and towns in Quebec
Populated places established in 2001
2001 establishments in Quebec